"Been Around the World" is a song by American rapper Puff Daddy, featuring the Notorious B.I.G. and Mase and included on Puff Daddy's debut studio album No Way Out (1997). The song samples David Bowie's 1983 hit song "Let's Dance", and contains an interpolation of Lisa Stansfield's song "All Around the World", sung by the Notorious B.I.G. in the chorus. In the album version, the song concludes with a skit featuring an interview with "The Mad Producer".

The song was released as a single on November 14, 1997; it was the fourth single released from the album. Like the previous three singles, which all reached No. 1 or No. 2 on the Billboard Hot 100 chart, "Been Around the World" hit No. 2 on the chart, in the first two weeks of 1998. "Been Around the World" did reach No. 1 on Billboard's Hot Rap Tracks and Hot R&B/Hip-Hop Songs charts.

The song's music video was directed by Paul Hunter. It features Mase and Puff Daddy as spies. The video includes appearances by Vivica A. Fox, Quincy Jones, Wyclef Jean and Jennifer Lopez.

Track listing 
 Been Around The World (Radio Edit) featuring the Notorious B.I.G. & Mase (4:04)
 It's All About The Benjamins (Rock Remix I) featuring the Notorious B.I.G., Lil' Kim, The Lox, Dave Grohl, Perfect, FuzzBubble, & Rob Zombie (4:45)
 It's All About The Benjamins (Rock Remix II) featuring the Notorious B.I.G., Lil' Kim, The Lox, Dave Grohl, Perfect, FuzzBubble, Rob Zombie, & Size 14 (4:42)
 It's All About The Benjamins (Album Version) featuring the Notorious B.I.G., Lil' Kim, & The Lox (4:38)

Charts

Weekly charts

Year-end charts

Certifications

References

External links

Sean Combs songs
Mase songs
The Notorious B.I.G. songs
1997 singles
Music videos directed by Paul Hunter (director)
Bad Boy Records singles
Songs written by David Bowie
Songs written by Sean Combs
Songs written by Lisa Stansfield
Songs written by the Notorious B.I.G.
1997 songs
Arista Records singles
Songs written by Ian Devaney
Songs written by Andy Morris (musician)
Songs written by Mase
Songs written by Deric Angelettie